FFL may refer to:

Entertainment 
 Fanie Fourie's Lobola, a 2013 South African film
 Fantasy Football League, a former British television program
 The Final Fantasy Legend, a handheld role-playing game for the Game Boy
 "FFL", a song by Foo Fighters on the album Five Songs and a Cover

Military 
 Forces françaises libres (the Free French Forces), active during the Second World War 
 French Foreign Legion, a wing of the French Army

Sport 
 FAO Football League, in Odisha, India
 First Federal League, a football league in Yugoslavia
 Flemish American Football League, a Belgian American football league
 Freedom Football League, an upcoming American sports league

Other uses 
 Fear Factor Live, a live stunt show based on the Fear Factor TV series
 ﬄ, a typographic ligature; see List of XML and HTML character entity references
 Fairfield Municipal Airport (Iowa), in the United States
 Federal Firearms License, for firearms manufacturers in the United States
 Feminists for Life, an American anti-abortion organization
 Fit for Life, a dieting book series
 Flange focal length
 Flavorite Ice Cream, an ice cream manufacturer in Trinidad and Tobago
 Florida Forensic League, an American high school debate organization
 Focal fatty liver
 Food for Life (disambiguation)
 Fossil Fuel Levy, in the United Kingdom
 Foundation for Family and Life, a Catholic charismatic lay community
 Foundation for Feedback Learning, now Ganas, an intentional community in the U.S. city of New York
 Front focal length
 Friends for Life (disambiguation)
 Friedman Fleischer & Lowe, an American private equity firm
 Fucked For Life, a Swedish gang